Abadan was a 288-ton coastal tanker which was built as Empire Anglesey in 1945. She was renamed Abadan in 1946 and Renee J in 1961. She served until 1969 when she was scrapped in Cork

History
Empire Anglesey was built by J Harker Ltd, Knottingley as yard number 169. She was launched on 16 June 1945 and completed in October 1945. Empire Anglesey was built for the Ministry of War Transport and operated under the management of the C Rowbotham & Sons. She was homeported in Goole. she was powered by a 6-cylinder 2-stroke Single Cycle Single Action diesel engine made by Crossley Ltd, Manchester.

Empire Anglesey was sold to A/S Tankskibsrederiet, Copenhagen, Denmark in 1946 and renamed Abadan. She operated under the management of K V Tersling and spent some time chartered to Rederi AB Reut, Kungsbacka, Sweden.

In 1961, Abadan was sold to Celtic Coasters Ltd, Dublin, Ireland and renamed Renee J. She served with them for eight years. She was scrapped in Cork in March 1969.

Official number and code letters
Official Numbers were a forerunner to IMO Numbers.

Empire Anglesey had the UK Official Number 180993  and used the Code Letters GKGX.

References

External links
Photo of MT Abadan

1945 ships
Ships built in England
Empire ships
Ministry of War Transport ships
World War II tankers
Tankers of the United Kingdom
Tankers of Denmark
Tankers of the Republic of Ireland